The Super Tour is synthpop duo Pet Shop Boys' 2016–2019 world tour in support of their album Super. The tour started as a four-night residency entitled Inner Sanctum at the Royal Opera House in London, and visited North America, South America, Europe and Asia.

Concept
For the first time in many years, Pet Shop Boys have a full band playing with them onstage (mostly consisting of keyboardists, vocalists and percussionists).

Critical reception
Joe Lynch from Billboard described the New York City concert as "There was a stark white-and-black arcade game aesthetic, a picturesque sunset paired with smoky wide-beam lasers, concentric circles rendered in vibrant greens, blues and pinks, and glowing, multi-colored balloons at the close of the show."

Set list 
The following setlist corresponds to their Berlin, Germany, concert on 1 December and reflects the typical setlist of the tour.

The setlist includes 4 songs from the current album Super, 3 songs from their albums Please, Introspective and Electric each, 1 from Actually, Very, Bilingual, Nightlife, Release, Fundamental, Yes and Elysium each and 1 non-album song.

Tour dates

References

2016 concert tours
2017 concert tours
Pet Shop Boys concert tours